The Befehlshaber der Unterseeboote or BdU (Eng: "Commander of the U-boats") was the supreme commander of the German Navy's U-boat Arm (Ubootwaffe) during the First and Second World Wars. The term also referred to the Command HQ of the U-boat arm.

The title was established in June 1917, replacing the role of "Leader of the U-boats" (Führer der Unterseeboote, or FdU) for the High Seas Flotillas. The first incumbent was Kapitan zur See/Kommodore Andreas Michelsen, previously head of the High Seas Fleet’s destroyer force. The post was abolished with  the end of the war.

It was revived on 17 October 1939, when Karl Dönitz was promoted to rear admiral (Konteradmiral). His previous title had been FdU, a position he had held from January 1936.

On 31 January 1943 Dönitz was promoted to grand admiral (Großadmiral) and became supreme commander (Oberbefehlshaber der Kriegsmarine) of the entire Kriegsmarine, replacing Erich Raeder. He retained the title, but was replaced as operational commander at BdU by his chief of staff Eberhard Godt.

Godt's successor was Admiral Hans Georg von Friedeburg, who held the position at the end of the war and became commander-in-chief of the German navy when Doenitz became head of Nazi Germany after Hitler's suicide.

Imperial German Navy (Kaiserliche Marine)

Andreas Michelsen (June 1917 to November 1918)

Kriegsmarine

Commander

Subordinate
Department Chief

2nd Admiral of the U-boats

Commanding Admiral of the U-boats

Dobratz had transferred from navy to Luftwaffe in 1935. He rejoined the Kriegsmarine in 1943 and was given command of U-1232 taking it out on one patrol before becoming chief of staff at BdU.

Chief of Staff of the Commanding Admiral of the U-boats

Beucke was withdrawn from command of U-boat (a single patrol with  ) in 1942 because his brothers had been killed.

Notes

References
 Arnold Hague : The Allied Convoy System 1939–1945 (2000).  (Canada);  (UK).
 VE Tarrant (1989) The U-Boat Offensive 1914-1945 Arms & Armour 

Submarines of the Kriegsmarine
U-boats
World War II submarines of Germany